Charles Hawks Jr. (July 7, 1899 – January 6, 1960) was a U.S. Representative from Wisconsin.

Born in Horicon, Wisconsin, he went to University of Wisconsin-Madison and served in the United States Navy during World War I. He was a salesman and worked in the insurance business. He served on the Dodge County, Wisconsin Board of Supervisors 1933–1937. In 1943, Hawks moved to Pennsylvania where he worked in public relations. As a Republican he represented Wisconsin's 2nd congressional district in the 76th United States Congress. He died in Bryn Mawr, Pennsylvania.

Notes

External links

1899 births
1960 deaths
People from Horicon, Wisconsin
Businesspeople from Wisconsin
County supervisors in Wisconsin
University of Wisconsin–Madison alumni
Republican Party members of the United States House of Representatives from Wisconsin
20th-century American politicians
20th-century American businesspeople